Anna Hopkins (born February 12, 1987) is a Canadian actress. She is best known for her role as Lilith in Freeform's original series Shadowhunters and documentary filmmaker Monica Stuart in The Expanse.

Early life and education 
Hopkins was born in Montreal, Quebec, Canada, to Rita Hopkins, a graphic designer, and visual artist Tom Hopkins. She is of Jewish Romanian and Hungarian descent from her mother's side, and Scottish, Welsh descent on her father's side. She is fluent in French and English. She trained in hip hop dancing and planned to start a dancing career after high-school when her interests shifted to theatre.

In 2012 Hopkins achieved a Bachelor of Arts in Communication Studies from the Concordia University and a Bachelor of Arts and Science from the Paris Institute of Political Studies in Paris.

Career 
Hopkins first appeared in the miniseries Human Trafficking in 2005, and thenafter in Canadian television series and television films, among them the character of Samantha Clayton in a crossover of The Flash and Arrow in 2014, and was credited as writer for Girl Couch. She also played in Barney's Version (2010) alongside Paul Giamatti and Dustin Hoffman, and The Grand Seduction starring Brendan Gleeson in 2013. One of her better-known roles was the recurring character Jessica 'Berlin' Rainer in the second and third seasons of the sci-fi series Defiance. Hopkins was promoted to series regular for the third, and last season; Defiance was cancelled by SyFy on 16 October 2015.

She was a Canadian Screen Award nominee for Best Lead Performance in a Web Program or Series at the 10th Canadian Screen Awards in 2022 for the web series For the Record.

Filmography

Awards and nominations 
 2011 ACTRA Montreal Awards, nominated as Outstanding Performance - Female for Barney's Version.
 2018 TV Scoop Awards, nominated as Best Drama Actress and Best Villain for Lilith on Shadowhunters
 2018 Teen Choice Awards, nominated as Choice TV: Villain for Lilith on Shadowhunters

References

External links 
 

1987 births
Living people
Actresses from Montreal
Anglophone Quebec people
Canadian film actresses
Canadian television actresses
Canadian people of Hungarian-Jewish descent
Canadian people of Romanian-Jewish descent
Canadian people of Scottish descent
Canadian people of Welsh descent
21st-century Canadian actresses
Sciences Po alumni
Concordia University alumni